Predrag Banović (born 28 October 1969) in Prijedor, Bosnia and Herzegovina, Yugoslavia) is a Bosnian Serb who was charged with war crimes by the International Criminal Tribunal for the Former Yugoslavia (ICTY) for his actions at the Keraterm camp during the Bosnian War. He pleaded guilty to all charges in a bargain and was sentenced to serve eight years in prison, with credit for 716 days as time served.

Banović was arrested along with his twin brother, Nenad Banović, on 8 November 2001 in Serbia. He faced thirteen counts of crimes against humanity and twelve counts of violations of the laws of war. His case was processed along with those of Željko Meakić, Momcilo Gruban, Dušan Fuštar and Duško Knežević and was referred to as "Omarska and Keraterm Camps". On 28 July 2004, Banović was transferred to France to serve his sentence in a French prison. On 3 September 2008, he was granted early release.

See also
 Omarska camp
 Keraterm camp

References

External links
 ICTY Consolidated Indictment
 ICTY Sentencing Judgement

1969 births
Living people
Army of Republika Srpska soldiers
People convicted by the International Criminal Tribunal for the former Yugoslavia
People indicted by the International Criminal Tribunal for the former Yugoslavia
People from Prijedor
Serbs of Bosnia and Herzegovina convicted of war crimes
Bosnia and Herzegovina people imprisoned abroad
Prisoners and detainees of France
Serbs of Bosnia and Herzegovina convicted of crimes against humanity
Bosnia and Herzegovina twins